The Curious Sofa is a 1961 book by Edward Gorey, published under the pen name "Ogdred Weary" (an anagram). According to the cover, the book is a "pornographic illustrated story about furniture". Reviews of the book clarify there is nothing overtly sexual in the illustrations, although innuendos (and strategically deployed urns and tree branches) abound. The New York Times Book Review described it as "Gorey's naughty, hilarious travesty of lust". Gorey has stated that he intended to satirize Story of O.

The story may also be found in Gorey's 1972 anthology Amphigorey.

The German translation was banned in Austria in 1966 on the grounds of "This publication is therefore suitable for deleteriously influencing the moral, mental and health development of young people, particularly by stimulating lustfulness and misleading the sex drive."

References

Notes

Other sources 
 
 

1961 books
Books by Edward Gorey
Comedy books
Satirical books
Works published under a pseudonym